The 1990 FIFA World Cup qualification UEFA Group 7 was a UEFA qualifying group for the 1990 FIFA World Cup. The group consisted of Belgium, Czechoslovakia, Luxembourg, Portugal and Switzerland.

The group was won by Belgium, who qualified for the 1990 FIFA World Cup. Czechoslovakia also qualified as runners-up.

Standings

Results

Notes

Goalscorers
There were 52 goals scored during the 20 games, an average of 2.6 goals per game.

7 goals

 Marc Van Der Linden

5 goals

 Kubilay Türkyilmaz

4 goals

 Michal Bílek
 Tomáš Skuhravý
 Rui Águas

3 goals

 Marc Degryse

2 goals

 Patrick Vervoort
 Vítor Paneira

1 goal

 Jan Ceulemans
 Bruno Versavel
 Jozef Chovanec
 Stanislav Griga
 Ivan Hašek
 Milan Luhový
 Ľubomír Moravčík
 Guy Hellers
 Robby Langers
 Théo Malget
 Rui Barros
 Paulo Futre
 Fernando Gomes
 João Pinto
 Frederico Rosa
 Christophe Bonvin
 Adrian Knup
 Alain Sutter
 Beat Sutter
 Dario Zuffi

1 own goal

 Alain Geiger (playing against Belgium)

7
1988–89 in Czechoslovak football
qual
1988–89 in Portuguese football
1989–90 in Portuguese football
1988–89 in Belgian football
Qual
1988–89 in Swiss football
1989–90 in Swiss football
1988–89 in Luxembourgian football
1989–90 in Luxembourgian football